The 1967 Winnipeg municipal election was held on October 25, 1967, to elect mayors, councillors and school trustees in the City of Winnipeg and its suburban communities.  There was no mayoral election in Winnipeg itself.

Results

Winnipeg

Robert Taft, Mark Danzker, Inez Trueman, Lloyd Stinson, William McGarva, Alan Wade, Slaw Rebchuk, Joseph Zuken and Donovan Swailes were elected to two-year terms on the Winnipeg city council.  Ernest A. Brotman was elected to a one-year term.

St. Vital

Source:  Winnipeg Free Press, 26 October 1967.

Municipal elections in Winnipeg
1967 in Manitoba
Winnipeg
October 1967 events in Canada